Coram may refer to:

Places
Coram's Fields, an area of open space in London
Coram, New York, a hamlet in Suffolk County
Coram, Montana, a place in Flathead County
Coram Experimental Forest, within the Flathead National Forest, near Kalispell, Montana

People
Thomas Coram (1668–1751), English philanthropist
Coram (c. 1883–1937), English music hall ventriloquist and singer; real name: Thomas Mitchell

Other uses
Coram, working name of the Thomas Coram Foundation for Children, an English charity
Coram nobis, legal term, a petition to the court
Coram non judice, legal term
Professor Coram, a character in Arthur Conan Doyle's Sherlock Holmes short story "The Adventure of the Golden Pince-Nez"
Farder Coram, a character in Philip Pullman's His Dark Materials trilogy

See also
Corum (disambiguation)